Lai Jean Quan (born October 21, 1949) is an American politician that served as the 49th mayor of Oakland, California from 2011 to 2015. She previously served as City Council member for Oakland's 4th District. Upon inauguration on January 3, 2011, she became Oakland's first female mayor. Quan ran an unsuccessful campaign for reelection in 2014, losing the mayoral race to Libby Schaaf, a member of the Oakland City Council.

Personal life
Quan was born in Livermore, California. Her family ties in the Bay Area date back to the 1870s, when her great-grandfather immigrated to San Francisco from Kaiping, Sze Yup. Quan's husband, Dr. Floyd Huen, is a doctor of internal medicine for Alameda County. They met at UC Berkeley as activists on Asian-American issues.

Oakland School Board and City Council
Quan was on the Oakland School Board for 12 years, starting in 1990 after organizing a citywide parent organization, Save Our Schools. As a parent leader she helped save the music program in the Oakland Schools. She served as chair of the California Urban Schools Association, the Asian Pacific Islanders School Board Members Association (APISBMA), and the Council of Urban Boards Association (the urban caucus of the National School Board Association representing the nation's 100 largest districts). She was appointed by the Clinton Administration to represent School Boards on the Title I Rules Making Committee. In these roles she advocated for more funding for urban and immigrant students, more inclusion of minority community history in textbooks, comprehensive school services and after school programs, and expansion of pre-school and adult education programs.

In 1996 with Quan as president, the school board instituted a program using Standard English Program strategies to teach standard English to African American students. The move created national news with the perception Oakland schools were teaching students "Ebonics" because there was discussion about Ebonics being used as a teaching tool.

In 2002, Jean Quan was elected to her first term as Council Member for Oakland District 4 (Allendale, Brookdale, Crestmont, Dimond, Laurel, Maxwell Park, Melrose, Montclair, and Redwood Heights). During her time on the Council she led several initiatives, including "Measure Q" to prevent the closure of city libraries and increase funding for materials,"Oakland Wildfire Prevention District" which would funds annual programs of vegetation control, safety inspections and homeowner education, and green waste/composting programs,"Oakland Cultural Arts Funding" which would add Hotel Tax to fund the Oakland Zoo, Oakland Museum of California, Chabot Space & Science Center, Oakland Convention and Visitors Bureau, and the Fund for Arts,"Measure Y for Public Safety and Measure BB" which would fund Fire, Police and Violence Prevention Programs.  The measure funds 63 police officers including geographically deployed "beat officers" and programs to prevent crimes and violence.

Quan was a past chair of the Alameda County Waste Management Authority (StopWaste.org) and the Alameda Recycling Board.  She also authored and voted for legislation which banned the use of polystyrene containers for take out foods, now widely adopted in other parts of California.

In July 2010, Quan along with fellow City Council member and mayoral candidate Rebecca Kaplan were investigated by Oakland police for their actions during a protest following the manslaughter verdict of former BART Police officer Johannes Mehserle. Police claimed Quan and Kaplan joined a "human chain" which prevented officers from clearing a street, while the two countered they were acting as "peacekeepers". No charges were filed against the Councilwomen.
Quan was the victim of a street robbery in September of the same year, in front of the Dimond neighborhood Safeway supermarket. Quan attributed the crime to lack of employment opportunities in Oakland.

2010 Oakland mayoral election
Oakland's 2010 election was held under the city's new instant-runoff voting or ranked choice voting ballot system, which allows voters to indicate their first, second, and third choices of candidate. More than 120,000 voters participated in the largest turnout for a Mayor's race in recent memory. The top three finishers among a field of 10 candidates were Quan, Don Perata, and Rebecca Kaplan.

In the initial tally on election night, Perata led Quan, 40,342 to 29,266 but did not have a majority of the first-place votes. The votes were then re-tallied by eliminating each candidate at the bottom, until one candidate obtained a majority.  After several rounds of candidate elimination, the last candidate to be eliminated was Kaplan, the third-place candidate.  Her votes were then allocated according to each voter's wishes to the remaining two candidates, Perata and Quan. The Alameda Registrar of voters then declared Quan the winner with 53,897 votes from 105,769 valid votes (50.96% of the valid votes).

Oakland Mayor

Initiatives
Within her first six months in office, Mayor Quan met with more than 3,000 residents in eight town hall meetings. The resulting priorities reportedly developed by residents at these sessions were to help focus the city's and community's agenda.
Her election as Oakland's first female mayor, and the first Chinese-American female mayor of a major U.S. city, resulted in high visibility nationally and internationally. Quan capitalized on this visibility by traveling to and meeting with potential trade and business partners for the City and Port of Oakland.

Education
Quan increased collaboration with the Oakland Unified School District and the community, introducing a program offering late-night youth services in the East and West Oakland areas in attempts to decrease violence with school-age youth.  In 2011, she also formed the Oakland Education Cabinet with the OUSD Superintendent and the Dean of the Mills College School of Education.

Crime
After a surge in violence in one particular area of Oakland, Quan walked the beat with police in the neighborhood, encouraging residents to join a neighborhood crime prevention council. With gun violence up 30% from before her term, many residents and press view community policing with skepticism; "Even law-abiding citizens with good intentions aren't going to risk life and limb in areas of the city where the police don't feel safe." wrote one reporter. Despite the skepticism, the outreach is making a difference: calls to the drug hotline went from 0 to 103 in the first six months; participation in the local Neighborhood Crime Prevention Council has gone from 5 neighbors to almost two dozen neighbors meeting with police each month and identifying hotspots and priorities; calls to the Public Works Agency for blight, streetlights and other infrastructure complaints increased by 53%, and the number of National Night Out events this past August more than doubled. She has also begun helping rebuild the Oakland Police Department's workforce, by hiring more officers.  In October 2011, Quan introduced Oakland's 100 Block Plan, under the claim "90% of shootings and homicides occurred"in 5% of the City—or approximately 100 city blocks.".  The premise for these statistics would be disproved by the Urban Strategies Council and disavowed by Quan  and officials from Oakland's city government.  The plan was overseen by Chief of Police Howard Jordan, but would prove to be underwhelming.  Quan proposed the hiring of Bill Bratton, a former Chief of Police in Boston and Los Angeles, as a consultant on the departmental issues, which was later approved by the city council.  Combined with the underwhelming results of the 100 Blocks Plan and Bratton's report on widespread issues within the Oakland Police Department led to Howard Jordan's eventual resignation in May 2013.  Anthony Toribio would fill in the interim for two days until Quan appointed Deputy Chief Sean Whent.  Under Chief Whent, the city implemented the Operation Ceasefire program, which emphasized components of restorative justice.  In May 2014, Quan promoted Whent to the permanent position  after a major drop in violent crime during his tenure, according to police statistics.

Board memberships
She was board chair of the Chabot Space & Science Center and serves on the Board of the California League of Cities.

Criticism and praise
During the second week of Quan's tenure in January 2011, it was discovered Oakland Police chief Anthony Batts was a top-two candidate for the open position of San Jose Police chief. Two weeks later, Quan introduced a plan for the police department which included updating the technological staff and rehiring 10 of the 80 officers who were laid off the previous year. Batts announced his intention to remain in Oakland a few days later, but eventually resigned in October of the same year.

Quan has come under fire due to a relationship with "unpaid legal adviser" Dan Siegel after Siegel represented the "mayor's office on various legal matters, from public records act requests to a private meeting with a judge overseeing a consent decree with the police department", according to the San Francisco Chronicle. The Oakland City Council issued a demand Siegel not represent the city as an attorney in any capacity, which by law falls under the jurisdiction of the City Attorney's office.
Siegel had been considered a controversial figure at City Hall due to his supposed vocal criticism of Oakland Police, and his presence was reported to have exacerbated a feud between Quan and City Attorney John Russo.
In June 2011, Russo left his post as Oakland City Attorney to become City Manager for Alameda.

A KPIX/CBS5 poll taken just before Mayor Quan's first 100 days revealed that her job performance "garners the approval of the city's residents by a 2–1 margin." The Capitol Weekly named Mayor Quan one of the top ten "Good" Mayors in the state. A KPIX poll six months later, taken shortly after the resignation of Chief Batts, listed an approval rating of 28 percent, with 69 percent responding with "little or no confidence" the mayor's ability to reduce the city's crime problem.

On October 26, 2011 it was reported Quan responded to a recall petition by saying she believed the signatories were frustrated with her lack of progress in creating jobs. She went on to KGO radio claiming "I'm too busy. ... I haven't even had a chance to look at the petitions."

Quan remained unpopular in the city of Oakland.  A 2013 SurveyUSA poll found 60 percent of residents disapproved of her job performance and 65 percent said the city was on the wrong track, with crime the voters' primary concern.  The Asian-American community gave her the lowest marks, with 67 percent disapproving of her performance.

2011 Occupy Oakland protest

Mayor Quan received widespread national criticism in October 2011 for her handling of the Occupy Oakland protest.  On October 11, Mayor Quan visited the protest site. Thirteen days later more than 500 police officers from Oakland, other area police departments, and the State of California were directed to use tear gas and batons to clear the plaza where the protests were being held. Mayor Quan was in Washington, D.C. at the time on city business. Quan issued a statement the next morning commending the police chief "for a generally peaceful resolution to a situation". That night, hundreds of police used tear gas, rubber bullets, and flashbang grenades to subdue and arrest over 100 protesters, though denied the use of rubber bullets and flashbang grenades during the press release. The mayor's office was flooded with demands that protesters be released and her legal adviser opposed the police action and threatened to resign.

One protester, war veteran Scott Olsen, was hospitalized with a fractured skull after being struck in the forehead by police projectiles. On November 2, a second protester-veteran, Kayvan Sabehgi, suffered a ruptured spleen when he was hit and tackled by Oakland Police in an area away from the protests' center.
By November 14, two of Mayor Quan's top advisors, legal advisor Dan Siegel and Deputy Mayor Sharon Cornu, had resigned.

Quan was criticized for apparent insensitivity at an Oakland City Council meeting on March 6, 2013.  In a conversation with war veteran Scott Olsen, she accused him of having a "chip on his shoulder".  Later, Olsen tweeted, "J. Quan told me she realizes I have a chip on my shoulder. Insulting, more like a broken skull and brain trauma."

Recall petition
On December 7, 2011, the Oakland City Clerk's office approved the request by the Committee to Recall Jean Quan to begin collecting signatures to qualify a recall measure for a future ballot. The committee failed to collect enough signatures to qualify for a measure on the November 2012 ballot.

Cellphone use while operating a motor vehicle
Quan has been spotted using her cellular telephone numerous times by various San Francisco media, including "People Behaving Badly" Creator Stanley Roberts. On June 8, 2014, Quan was involved in a collision with a car in front of hers and it is alleged that she was again using her cellular telephone while operating a motor vehicle.

Coliseum City and the Prince of Dubai
On March 7, 2012, Quan unveiled an ambitious project to the media that was designed to improve the sports facilities of all three major league sports teams in the city (the Oakland Raiders, the Oakland Athletics, and the Golden State Warriors) and keep them from relocating to other markets, as well as attract new businesses to the city. The project, dubbed Coliseum City, had entailed the redevelopment of the existing Oakland–Alameda County Coliseum complex. The redevelopment would have seen the construction of two new stadiums on the present location, a baseball-only stadium and a football-only stadium, while Oracle Arena, home of the Warriors, would have been either rebuilt or undergone extensive renovations. A sum of $3.5 million was committed to preliminary planning on the project. However, no officials from any of Oakland's major league teams were present at the media conference.

In April 2014, after funding was thought to had dried up for the project, Quan gave an interview to KGMZ-FM where she announced that developers working on Coliseum City "are partnered literally with the prince of Dubai, who is next in line to lead Dubai. And they have capital."' The statement was immediately walked back by her spokesperson who said no actual partnership was in place, and Quan was criticized by members of city council for this.

2014 election
Quan ran for reelection in 2014. The leading candidates were Quan, Libby Schaaf, a member of the Oakland City Council, and Rebecca Kaplan, also a member of the city council. Though Kaplan was the early favorite, Schaaf finished first with 49 percent of the vote. Since no candidate received a majority and Quan finished third, she was eliminated in the subsequent ranked choice round.  When Quan's ballots were redistributed, Schaaf was the second choice on more ballots than Kaplan, enabling Schaaf to win with 63 percent to Kaplan's 37. Schaaf was sworn in on January 5, 2015.

References

1949 births
Living people
American mayors of Chinese descent
Women mayors of places in California
California Democrats
Mayors of Oakland, California
Oakland City Council members
People from Livermore, California
American women of Chinese descent in politics
California politicians of Chinese descent
Occupy Oakland
Asian-American city council members
Women city councillors in California
21st-century American women